Ellie Beaven (born 24 January 1980) is an English actress.

Early life and education
Beaven was born Ellen Patricia Beaven in Hammersmith, Greater London on 24 January 1980. Her mother Jennifer was born in India, which Beaven revealed in a newspaper interview while working on the TV series Down to Earth in 2001. She was educated at St Mary's R.C. Primary School in Isleworth, before then being educated at Gumley House Convent School, Isleworth.

Career

Film & television
Bevan's acting debut was in 1988 in the film Buster where she played the young Nicky Edwards alongside Phil Collins. Another one of her first roles included Earth Warp where she starred in all 10 episodes. In 1991 she played the role of young Ada Corishant in the TV mini-series "The Mysteries of the Dark Jungle". After parts in The Laughter of God, Mole's Christmas and The Snow Queen (the latter two being shows she provided voices for), she also provided voices for two other animated series, The Dreamstone and Bimble's Bucket, in the 1990s, both of which were created by Michael Jupp. In 1995 she appeared on stage as Wendla in an RSC production of Spring Awakening, and in 1997 she appeared as Natalie Wild in the BBC series The Wild House, in which she appeared in all three series. At the same time she was starring in the ITV series Wavelength, about a children's radio station, in which she played Kyla Kane. The show ran for two series, and alongside The Wild House she became a recognizable face on television.

2000 saw Beaven take more roles in shows aimed at adults rather than children. The first one of these was that of teenage rebel Sarah Addis in the series Down to Earth. This was followed by her portrayal of Carys in Arthur's Dyke as well as small parts in Doctors (2003) and Casualty (2004). She had previously appeared in Casualty on 25 January 1997, playing the daughter of paramedic Josh Griffiths; her character died in hospital from injuries suffered in a house fire.

On 11 April 2008 she played Nikki, girlfriend to Michael, in the opening episode of the eighth series of My Family.

On 28 June 2008 Beaven made another appearance in Casualty, playing a character called Sally, the daughter and carer of a disabled woman who gets hit by a car.

In January 2010 she appeared in two episodes of BBC soap opera EastEnders in the role of Archie Mitchell's solicitor Emma West, and in Aug 2010 she played the part of Sarah Gilligan in Holby City. She can also be seen in the television advertising campaign for Zoopla.

In January 2012 she had a guest role alongside Marcus Patric in an episode of the BBC1 daytime soap Doctors before appearing in the film Les Misérables, and the ITV series Endeavour the following year. After that she focused her career on theatre for the rest of the decade, but in 2022 she appeared on TV for the first time in 9 years in an episode of BBC comedy drama This Is Going To Hurt.

Theatre
Beaven has appeared in a number of theatre productions since her debut aged 11 in the RSC production of Dr Jekyll and Mr Hyde in 1991. As a teenager she appeared as Wendla in the controversial play Spring Awakening in 1995, which was adapted by the poet Ted Hughes. Between 10 August and 2 September 2006 she played Ela Delahay in Charley's Aunt at the Oxford Playhouse, and then Cecily Cardew in Oscar Wilde's The Importance of Being Earnest at the Derby Playhouse in January 2007. 

After appearing as Gerda in The Snow Queen at the Derby Playhouse in 2009, she then starred in She Stoops To Conquer at the Nottingham Playhouse in 2010. The following year saw her appear in productions such as Relatively Speaking at the Watermill Theatre from 17 February to 26 March 2011, as Hero in Much Ado About Nothing between 16 June and 2 July 2011 for the Guildford Shakepeare Company, and again for the company in The Merchant of Venice as Jessica, as well as appearing at the King's Head Theatre in the play Constance from September 2011 to make it a busy year for Beaven. In 2013 she appeared in the RSC production of Candide, the Criterion Theatre production of The 39 Steps and the J. B. Priestley play Dangerous Corner for Salisbury Playhouse. She appeared in 2015 in the acclaimed production of A Mad World, My Masters, playing Mrs Littledick, while in 2017 she appeared at the Swan Theatre for productions of Vice Versa as Voluptua between 11 May to 9 September, and in Dido, Queen of Carthage as Venus. Her most recent theatre performance has been as Lady Capulet in the production Romeo and Juliet at the Regent's Park Open Air Theatre on 24 June 2021.

Filmography

Television

References

External links

1980 births
Living people
English film actresses
English television actresses
English stage actresses
English radio actresses
Royal Shakespeare Company members
English voice actresses
Audiobook narrators
Animal impersonators
English Shakespearean actresses
English child actresses
Actresses from London
Whistlers
People from Isleworth